The National Institute on Deafness and Other Communication Disorders (NIDCD), a member of the U.S. National Institutes of Health, is mandated to conduct and support biomedical and behavioral research and research training in the normal and disordered processes of hearing, balance, smell, taste, voice, speech, and language. The institute also conducts and supports research and research training related to disease prevention and health promotion; addresses special biomedical and behavioral problems associated with people who have communication impairments or disorders; and supports efforts to create devices which substitute for lost and impaired sensory and communication function.

On September 3, 2019, Debara L. Tucci became NIDCD director. She is the first woman to be appointed to the role since the founding of the institution in 1988.

Differing from some other institutes, in 1999 the NIDCD discontinued the Multi-Purpose Research and Training Center funding mechanism (large center grants) for the entire institute focusing instead on single-project research awards (R01's).

Past Directors 
Past Directors from 1988 - present

References

External links 
 
 
 

Deafness
Deafness organizations
Medical research institutes in the United States
1988 establishments in the United States